The 2015–16 Wofford Terriers men's basketball team represented Wofford College during the 2015–16 NCAA Division I men's basketball season. The Terriers, led by 14th year head coach Mike Young, played their home games at the Benjamin Johnson Arena and were members of the Southern Conference. They finished the season 15–17, 11–7 in SoCon play to finish in a tie for third place. They lost in the quarterfinals of the SoCon tournament to Western Carolina.

Roster

Schedule

|-
!colspan=9 style="background:#886E4C; color:#000000;"| Regular season

|-
!colspan=9 style="background:#886E4C; color:#000000;"| SoCon tournament

References 

Wofford Terriers men's basketball seasons
Wofford
Wolf
Wolf